Mosorolava or Misorolava is a municipality in Madagascar. It belongs to the district of Antsiranana II, which is a part of Diana Region. According to 2001 census the population of Mosorolava was 7,362.

Only primary schooling is available in town. The majority 98% of the population are farmers.  The most important crop is rice, while other important products are banana and maize.  Services provide employment for 1% of the population. Additionally fishing employs 1% of the population.

References and notes 

Populated places in Diana Region